Read Dunes House is a historic home in Westchester Township, Porter County, Indiana.  It was built in 1952, and is a one-story, Prairie School style dwelling.  It measures 58 feet by 29 feet, and has a low-sloped gable roof.  The house was built for Philo Benham Read (1882–1961) and his wife Irene Martin Read (1902–1981), who were active in dunes preservation.  It was designed by their architect son Herbert P. Read.

The house was listed on the National Register of Historic Places in 2011.

References

Houses on the National Register of Historic Places in Indiana
Prairie School architecture in Indiana
Houses completed in 1952
Houses in Porter County, Indiana
National Register of Historic Places in Porter County, Indiana
National Register of Historic Places in Indiana Dunes National Park